Glossus humanus, the oxheart clam, is a species of species of marine clam found in deepwater off the Atlantic coastline of Europe and Northern Africa. It is the only remaining extant species in the genus Glossus.

Description
Glossus humanus has a shell reaching up to 160 mm in length, but usually it is between 60 and 80 mm. This shell is globular with a subcircular outline. The two valves viewed from the side are heart shaped, forming the outline of a human heart (hence the original species name, Cardium humanum). The walls of the shell are quite thin, equivalve, with a light weight. The outer surface usually is dark brown or olive green, with fine radial lines and frequently covered with short hairs. Glossus humanus lives half buried into the substratum, exposing only the lower margin of the shell and the siphon. It feeds on plankton and other microscopic particles that it 
filters out with its gills. Spawning occurs at the end of September.

<div align=center>
Right and left valve of the same specimen:

</div align=center>

Distribution
This species can be found in the eastern Atlantic ocean from Iceland and Norway to Morocco, Mediterranean Sea and Adriatic Sea.

Habitat
This species occurs in soft muddy or sandy substrates, from depths of 7 m up to 250 m, but more frequently below 50 m.

References
 G. Owen - On The Biology Of Glossus Humanus (L.) (Isocardia Cor Lam.) Journal of the Marine Biological Association of the United Kingdom
 Huber M. (2010) Compendium of bivalves. A full-color guide to 3,300 of the world’s marine bivalves. A status on Bivalvia after 250 years of research. Hackenheim: ConchBooks. 901 pp., 1
 WoRMS

External links
 Encyclopedia of Life
 Natural History Museum of the British Isles
 Marlin

Glossidae
Molluscs described in 1758
Taxa named by Carl Linnaeus